Juncus sorrentinoi is a species of plant in the family Juncaceae (rushes), with a Mediterranean distribution, and introduced to Madeira. It is listed as Vulnerable by the IUCN.

References

sorrentinoi
Flora of Morocco
Flora of Algeria
Flora of Tunisia
Flora of Portugal
Flora of Spain
Flora of the Balearic Islands
Flora of Corsica
Flora of Sardinia
Flora of Sicily
Flora of Greece
Plants described in 1857